Megaskepasma is a monotypic genus of plants containing the single species Megaskepasma erythrochlamys, known by the common name Brazilian red-cloak. Native to Venezuela and elsewhere in South America, it is a free branching, upright showy tropical shrub that grows to 3 m high with appressed reddish hairs, stout stems, and broad ovate  12–30 cm long dark green leaves with pink midrib. It is grown as an ornamental shrub in climates from warm temperate to tropical for its inflorescence, large erect heads of conspicuous crimson bracts, and two-lipped white flowers. This plant prefers a rich soil and is propagated from seed or cuttings.

References

 Ellison, Don (1999) Cultivated Plants of the World. London: New Holland (1st ed.: Brisbane: Flora Publications International, 1995) 
 Graf, Alfred Byrd (1986) Tropica: color cyclopedia of exotic plants and trees for warm-region horticulture--in cool climate the summer garden or sheltered indoors; 3rd ed. East Rutherford, N.J.: Roehrs Co

Acanthaceae
Acanthaceae genera
Monotypic Lamiales genera
Garden plants
Flora of South America
Flora of Venezuela